21st Century Breakdown World Tour was a headlining concert tour by American punk band Green Day in support of the group's eighth studio album, 21st Century Breakdown, which was released in May 2009.

The tour began with an eight-week leg throughout North America, kicking off in Seattle in July 2009 and culminating in Los Angeles in late August. The tour in the U.S had 11 Stadium shows, making it the most Stadiums played in Green Day's entire career until the Hella Mega Tour in 2021. The tour grossed about $64 million. A European leg followed, beginning in Lisbon in late September and wrapping up mid-November in Turin, Italy.

In December 2009, the group toured Australia and New Zealand, followed by Asian dates in January 2010. The group subsequently returned to Europe for a second leg of dates, beginning in late May 2010 with a headline appearance at the Pinkpop Festival in the Netherlands and two stadium shows in the United Kingdom. The tour ended with an appearance at the Rock Werchter festival in Werchter, Belgium in early July. A scheduled performance at the Heineken Jammin' Festival in Venice, Italy on July 4, 2010 was cancelled due to poor weather.

During their performances of "Longview", frontman Billie Joe Armstrong sprayed the front rows with water cannons, shot T-shirts into the crowd and pulled people onstage to sing with the band.

In March 2010, a second North American leg was announced, beginning in Camden, New Jersey in early August. A final leg of Central and South America followed in October.

A collection of recorded songs from throughout the tour and a bonus DVD of Green Day playing at the Saitama Super Arena in Japan are available on the live album Awesome as Fuck.

Opening acts
 AFI 
 Attaque 77 
 Billy Talent 
 The Bravery 
 Calling All Cars 
 Don Tetto 
 Donots 
 Foxboro Hot Tubs 
 Franz Ferdinand 
 The Hives 
 Jet 
 Joan Jett and the Blackhearts 
 Johnossi 
 John Olav Nilsen & Gjengen 
 Massacre 
 Kaiser Chiefs 
 Lado B 
 Nevilton 
 Paramore 
 The Pooh 
 Prima Donna 
 Rise Against 
 Superguidis 
 Frank Turner 
 Vaselina

Setlist
Typical setlist during the tour.
 "Song of the Century"
 "21st Century Breakdown" 
 "Know Your Enemy" 
 "East Jesus Nowhere" 
 "Holiday" 
 "The Static Age"
 "Before the Lobotomy"
 "Give Me Novacaine"
 "Are We the Waiting"
 "St. Jimmy"
 "Boulevard of Broken Dreams" 
 "Hitchin' a Ride"
 "Welcome to Paradise"
 "When I Come Around"
 "Brain Stew" 
 "Jaded" 
 "Longview" 
 "Basket Case" 
 "She" 
 "King for a Day"
 "Shout" 
 "21 Guns"
 "American Eulogy"
 "Minority"
Encore
"American Idiot" 
"Jesus of Suburbia" 
"Last Night on Earth"
Encore 2
"Wake Me Up When September Ends"
"Good Riddance (Time of Your Life)"

Tour dates

Cancelled tour dates
 July 4, 2010 – Heineken Jammin' Festival in Venice, Italy

Personnel

 Billie Joe Armstrong – lead vocals, harmonica, lead and rhythm guitars
 Mike Dirnt – bass, backing vocals
 Tré Cool – drums, percussion, backing vocals on "King For A Day/Shout"
 Jason White – lead and rhythm guitars, backing vocals
 Jason Freese – keyboards, piano, saxophone, accordion, acoustic guitar on "Are We The Waiting", backing vocals
 Jeff Matika – rhythm guitar, acoustic guitar, backing vocals

References

External links
 

2009 concert tours
2010 concert tours
Green Day concert tours